= Joy Jibrilu =

Bahamas civil servant

Joy Jibrilu is a government official and attorney in The Bahamas. Jibrilu is the Director General of The Bahamas Ministry of Tourism & Aviation. From 2008 to 2014 Jibrilu was the Director of Investments in the Bahamas Investment Authority (BIA) in the Office of the Prime Minister.
